The Theory of Everything is a 2014 biographical romantic drama film directed by James Marsh. Set at the University of Cambridge, it details the life of the theoretical physicist Stephen Hawking. It was adapted by Anthony McCarten from the 2007 memoir Travelling to Infinity: My Life with Stephen by Jane Hawking, which deals with her relationship with her ex-husband Stephen Hawking, his diagnosis of amyotrophic lateral sclerosis (ALS), and his success in the field of physics. The film stars Eddie Redmayne and Felicity Jones, with Charlie Cox, Emily Watson, Simon McBurney, Christian McKay, Harry Lloyd, and David Thewlis featured in supporting roles. The film had its world premiere at the 2014 Toronto International Film Festival on 7 November 2014. It had its UK premiere on 1 January 2015.

The film received positive reviews, with praise for the musical score, cinematography, and the performances of Jones and especially Redmayne. The film gained numerous awards and nominations, including five Academy Award nominations: Best Picture, Best Actress (Jones), Best Adapted Screenplay, Best Original Score (Jóhannsson) and won Best Actor for Redmayne. The film received 10 British Academy Film Awards (BAFTA) nominations, and won Outstanding British Film, Best Leading Actor for Redmayne, and Best Adapted Screenplay for McCarten. It received four Golden Globe Award nominations, winning the Golden Globe Award for Best Actor – Motion Picture Drama for Redmayne, and Best Original Score for Jóhannsson. It also received three Screen Actors Guild Awards nominations, and won the Screen Actors Guild Award for Outstanding Performance by a Male Actor in a Leading Role for Redmayne.

Plot
University of Cambridge astrophysics student Stephen Hawking begins a relationship with literature student Jane Wilde. Although Stephen is intelligent, his friends and professors are concerned about his lack of a thesis topic. After he and his professor Dennis Sciama attend a lecture on black holes, Stephen speculates that black holes may have been part of the creation of the universe, and decides to write his thesis on them. However, Stephen's muscles begin to fail, giving him decreasing coordination with his body. He learns he has motor neuron disease, which will eventually leave him unable to move, swallow, and even breathe. There are no treatments, and he has approximately two years to live. The doctor assures Stephen that his brain will not be affected, so his thoughts and intelligence will remain intact, but eventually, he will be unable to communicate them. As Stephen becomes reclusive, focusing on his work, Jane confesses she loves him. She tells his father she intends to stay with Stephen even as his condition worsens. They marry and have their first son, Robert.

Stephen presents his thesis to the examination board, arguing that a black hole created the universe in a Big Bang, that it will emit heat, and end in a Big Crunch. He begins using a wheelchair after his walking ability deteriorates. After the Hawkings have their daughter Lucy, Stephen develops a theory about the visibility of black holes and becomes a world-renowned physicist. Jane, focusing on the children as well as Stephen's health and increasing fame, is unable to work on her own thesis and becomes frustrated. Stephen tells her he will understand if she needs help. She joins a church choir, where she meets widower Jonathan and they become close friends. She employs him as a piano teacher for Robert, and Jonathan befriends the entire family, helping Stephen with his illness, supporting Jane, and playing with the children. When Jane gives birth to another son, Timothy, Stephen's mother asks Jane if the baby is Jonathan's, which she denies. Jonathan is appalled, but when he and Jane are alone, they admit their feelings for one another. He distances himself from the family, but Stephen tells him Jane needs him.

While attending an opera performance in Bordeaux, Stephen is taken ill and rushed to a hospital. The doctor informs Jane that he has pneumonia, and that he needs a tracheotomy to survive, but it will leave him mute. She agrees to the surgery. Stephen learns to use a spelling board, and uses it to communicate with Elaine, his new nurse. He receives a computer with a built-in voice synthesizer, and uses it to write a book, A Brief History of Time (1988), which becomes an international best-seller. Stephen tells Jane he has been invited to the United States to accept an award and will be taking Elaine with him. Jane faces the realization that the marriage has not been working, telling him she "did her best", and they agree to divorce. Stephen goes to the lecture with Elaine, the two have fallen in love, and Jane and Jonathan reunite. At the lecture, Stephen sees a student drop a pen; he imagines getting up to return it, almost crying at the reminder of how his disease has affected him. He goes on to give a speech telling audiences to pursue their ambitions despite the harsh reality of life: "While there's life, there is hope".

Stephen invites Jane to meet Queen Elizabeth II with him when being made a member of the Order of the Companions of Honour; they share a happy day together with their children. An extended closing series comprises select moments from the film; shown in reverse, back to the moment Stephen first saw Jane; the reversal is reminiscent of Stephen's research methodology of reversing time to understand the beginning of the universe. Later, Jane and Jonathan marry, and she completes her Doctor of Philosophy. She and Stephen remain close friends. Stephen declines a knighthood from the Queen and continues his research, with no plans to retire in the near future.

Cast

Production

Development

Screenwriter Anthony McCarten had been interested in Hawking since reading his seminal book A Brief History of Time in 1988. In 2004, McCarten read Jane Hawking's memoir Travelling to Infinity: My Life with Stephen, and subsequently began writing a screenplay adaptation of the book, with no guarantees in place. He met numerous times with Jane at her home to discuss the project. After multiple drafts, he was introduced in 2009 to producer Lisa Bruce via their mutual ICM agent, Craig Bernstein.

Bruce spent three years with McCarten, further convincing Jane Hawking to agree to a film adaptation of her book, with Bruce stating, "It was a lot of conversation, many glasses of sherry, and many pots of tea". On 18 April 2013, James Marsh was confirmed to direct the film, with the shooting being based in Cambridge, and at other locations in the United Kingdom, with Eddie Redmayne courted to fill the male lead of the piece. On 23 June 2013, it was revealed that Felicity Jones was confirmed to play the film's female lead role opposite Redmayne. On 8 October 2013, it was confirmed that Emily Watson and David Thewlis had joined the cast and that Working Title's Tim Bevan, Eric Fellner, Lisa Bruce, and Anthony McCarten would be producing the piece.

Marsh had studied archival images to give the film its authenticity, stating, "When we had photographs and documentary footage of Stephen that related to our story, we tried to reproduce them as best we could". Redmayne met with Hawking himself, commenting, "Even now, when he's unable to move, you can still see such effervescence in his eyes". He described portraying Hawking on-screen as a "hefty" challenge, adding that, "The real problem with making a film is of course you don't shoot chronologically. So it was about having to really try and chart his physical deterioration [so] you can jump into it day-to-day, whilst at the same time keeping this spark and wit and humour that he has".

Redmayne spent six months researching Hawking's life, watching every piece of interview footage he could find of him. He studied Hawking's accent and speech patterns under dialect coach Julia Wilson-Dickson to prepare for the role. Marsh stated that what Redmayne had to do was not easy. "He had to take on enormous amounts of difficult preparation, as well as embracing the difficult physicality of the role. It's not just doing a disability. It's actually charting the course of an illness that erodes the body, and the mind has to project out from that erosion", he said. He added that Hawking gave him his blessing, and also revealed that, "[Hawking's] response was very positive, so much so that he offered to lend his voice, the real voice that he uses. The voice you hear in the latter part of the story is in fact Stephen's actual electronic voice as he uses it", he said. It was revealed to the Toronto International Film Festival (TIFF) audience that as the lights came up at a recent screening, a nurse had wiped a tear from Hawking's cheek.

Jane Hawking, speaking on BBC Radio 4's Woman's Hour, talked of meeting Jones several times while the latter prepared for the role. When Hawking saw the finished film, she was amazed to see that Jones had incorporated her mannerisms and speech patterns into her performance.

Filming

By 8 October 2013, principal photography had begun, with the shooting being done at Cambridge University, and at other locations in Cambridgeshire and across the United Kingdom.
Prior to the start of principal photography, Working Title had begun shooting on the lawn in front of the New Court building from 23 September 2013 to 27 September 2013; they filmed the Cambridge May Ball scene, set in 1963. On 24 September 2013, scenes were filmed at St John's College, The Backs in Queen's Road, and Queen's Green. The New Court lawn and Kitchen Bridge were included features in the filming location of the piece. The May Ball scene was the last of the outside shoots, with filming in a lecture theatre the following day, and the remaining filming completed in the studio over the final five weeks of production.

The pyrotechnic specialists Titanium Fireworks, who developed the displays for the London 2012 Olympic Games, provided three identical firework displays for the Trinity College, Cambridge May Ball scene.

Music

Composer Jóhann Jóhannsson scored The Theory of Everything. His score in the film has been described as including "[Jóhannsson's] signature blend of acoustic instruments and electronics". Jóhannsson commented that "it always involves the layers of live recordings, whether it's orchestra or a band or solo instrument, with electronics and more 'soundscapey' elements which can come from various sources". Jóhannsson's score was highly praised, being nominated for an Academy Award for Best Original Score, a BAFTA Award for Best Film Music, a Critics' Choice Movie Award for Best Score and a Grammy Award for Best Score Soundtrack for Visual Media, winning the Golden Globe Award for Best Original Score. The soundtrack was recorded at Abbey Road Studios.

The music that plays over the final scene of Hawking and his family in the garden and the reverse-flashback is "The Arrival of the Birds", composed and played by The Cinematic Orchestra, originally from the soundtrack to the 2008 nature documentary The Crimson Wing: Mystery of the Flamingos.

Post-production
During editing, filmmakers tried to remake Hawking's synthesised voice, but it did not turn out as they wanted. Hawking enjoyed the film enough that he granted them permission to use his own synthesised voice, which is heard in the final film.

Historical accuracy
The film takes various dramatic liberties with the history it portrays. Writing for the film blog of UK daily newspaper The Guardian, Michelle Dean noted:  In Slate, L.V. Anderson wrote that "the Stephen played by Eddie Redmayne is far gentler and more sensitive" than suggested in Travelling to Infinity. The Slate article further noted that the character Brian, Hawking's closest friend at Cambridge in the film, is not based on a real individual, but rather a composite of several of his real-life friends.

The film alters some of the details surrounding the beginning of Stephen and Jane's relationship, including how they met, as well as the fact that Jane knew about Stephen's disease before they started dating. Slate also comments that the film underplays Hawking's stubbornness and refusal to accept outside assistance for his disorder.

For The Guardian, Dean concluded by saying: 

Physicist Adrian Melott, a former student of Dennis Sciama, Hawking's doctoral supervisor portrayed in the film, strongly criticised the portrayal of Sciama in the film.

In the film, when Stephen attends the opera in Bordeaux, his companion was actually Raymond LaFlamme, his PhD student.

In the film, it is explained that Stephen's voice is taken from an answering machine. It is actually the voice of Dr. Dennis H. Klatt.

Release
On 8 October 2013, Universal Pictures International had acquired the rights to distribute the film internationally.

On 10 April 2014, Focus Features acquired the distribution rights to The Theory of Everything in the United States, with the plan of a 2014 limited theatrical release. publisher after, Entertainment One Films picked up the Canadian distribution rights. The first trailer of the film was released on 7 August 2014.

The Theory of Everything premiered at the Toronto International Film Festival (TIFF) on 7 September 2014, where it opened in the official sidebar section, Special Presentations.

The film had a limited release in the United States on 7 November 2014, expanded in successive weeks to Taiwan, Austria, and Germany, ahead of a United Kingdom release on 1 January 2015, before being released throughout Europe.

Reception

Box office
The Theory of Everything earned $122,873,310 worldwide, with its biggest markets coming from North America ($35.9 million), and the United Kingdom ($31.9 million). The film had a North American limited release on 7 November 2014; it was released in five theatres, and earned $207,000 on its opening weekend, for an average of $41,400 per theatre. The film was then widely released on 26 November across 802 theatres, earning US$5 million, and debuting at No. 7 at the box office. During its five-day Thanksgiving week, the film earned $6.4 million.

Critical response
Film review aggregator Rotten Tomatoes reports an approval rating of 80% based on 273 reviews, with an average rating of 7.3/10. The site's critical consensus reads, "Part biopic, part love story, The Theory of Everything rises on James Marsh's polished direction and the strength of its two leads." Metacritic assigned the film a weighted average score of 71 out of 100, based on 47 critics, indicating "generally favorable reviews".

Catherine Shoard of The Guardian wrote, "Redmayne towers: this is an astonishing, genuinely visceral performance which bears comparison with Daniel Day-Lewis in My Left Foot". Lou Lumenick, in his review for The New York Post, called the film "tremendously moving and inspirational". Justin Chang of Variety remarked, "A stirring and bittersweet love story, inflected with tasteful good humor...." He continued by praising the "superb performances" from Redmayne and Jones, as well commenting very positively about Jóhannsson's score, "whose arpeggio-like repetitions and progressions at times evoke the compositions of Philip Glass", whilst praising John Paul Kelly's production design, and Steven Noble's costumes. Leslie Felperin of The Hollywood Reporter remarked, "A solid, duly moving account of their complicated relationship, spanning roughly 25 years, and made with impeccable professional polish", praising Delhomme's cinematography as having "lush, intricately lit compositions", and adding "a splendor that keeps the film consistently watchable", and Jóhannsson's score as "dainty precision with a ineffable scientific quality about it". The Daily Telegraphs Tim Robey granted the film a positive review, stating that, "In its potted appraisal of Hawking's cosmology, The Theory of Everything bends over backwards to speak to the layman, and relies on plenty of second-hand inspiration. But it borrows from the right sources, this theory. And that's something", while praising Redmayne's performance, McCarten's script, and Delhomme's cinematography. Deadline Hollywoods Pete Hammond marked McCarten's script and Marsh's direction for praise, and of the film's Toronto reception, wrote: "To say the response here was rapturous would not be understating the enthusiasm I heard — not just from pundits, but also Academy voters with whom I spoke. One told me he came in with high expectations for a quality movie, and this one exceeded them".

The film was not without its detractors. Some criticised Marsh's focus on Hawking's romantic life over his scientific achievements. Alonso Duralde of The Wrap stated that "Hawking's innovations and refusal to subscribe to outdated modes of thinking merely underscore the utter conventionality of his film biography". Eric Kohn of Indiewire added that "James Marsh's biopic salutes the famous physicist's commitment, but falls short of exploring his brilliant ideas". Dennis Overbye of the New York Times noted:  Writing for The Guardians film blog, Michelle Dean argues that the film does a disservice to Jane Wilde Hawking, by "rearrang[ing] the facts to suit certain dramatic conventions... The Theory of Everything is hell-bent on preserving the cliche".

The film's producers, writer, director Marsh, and actors Redmayne and Jones were widely favoured for award season success.

Accolades

The Theory of Everything received several awards and nominations following its release. At the 87th Academy Awards, it was nominated in the categories of Best Picture, Best Actor for Eddie Redmayne, Best Actress for Jones, Best Adapted Screenplay for McCarten, and Best Original Score for Jóhann Jóhannsson; with Eddie Redmayne winning the film's sole Academy Award for his performance. The film was nominated for ten British Academy Film Awards, (winning for Best Adapted Screenplay, Best British Film, and Best Actor), five Critics' Choice Movie Awards, and three Screen Actors Guild Awards. At the 72nd Golden Globe Awards, Redmayne won Best Actor – Motion Picture Drama, and Jóhannsson won Best Original Score. The film, and Jones were also nominated. Production designer John Paul Kelly earned a nomination for Excellence in Production Design for a Period Film from the Art Directors Guild, while the producers were nominated for Best Theatrical Motion Picture by the Producers Guild of America.

References

External links

 The Theory of Everything — official website at FocusFeatures.com
 
 The Theory of Everything at the British Film Institute
 
 
 

Cultural depictions of Stephen Hawking
2014 films
2010s biographical drama films
2014 romantic drama films
BAFTA winners (films)
Best British Film BAFTA Award winners
Biographical films about mathematicians
Biographical films about scientists
British biographical drama films
British romantic drama films
Films directed by James Marsh
Culture of the University of Cambridge
Films about educators
Films about mathematics
Films about paraplegics or quadriplegics
Films set in the 1960s
Films set in the 1970s
Films set in the 1980s
Films shot in Berkshire
Films shot in Cambridgeshire
Films shot in England
Films shot in Surrey
Films featuring a Best Actor Academy Award-winning performance
Films featuring a Best Drama Actor Golden Globe winning performance
Films whose writer won the Best Adapted Screenplay BAFTA Award
Films produced by Eric Fellner
Films produced by Tim Bevan
Films scored by Jóhann Jóhannsson
Films with screenplays by Anthony McCarten
British historical romance films
Motor neuron diseases
Working Title Films films
Stephen Hawking
Films about physics
Films set in universities and colleges
2010s English-language films
2010s British films
Films set in the University of Cambridge